Goldwasser is a surname. Notable people with the surname include:

 Benjamin Goldwasser, member of MGMT
 Eugene Goldwasser, biochemist
 Ehud Goldwasser, an Israeli soldier
 I. Edwin Goldwasser, American teacher, philanthropist, and businessman
 Ned Goldwasser, American physicist
 Orly Goldwasser, professor of Egyptology
 Robin Goldwasser, an American singer and playwright
 Shafi Goldwasser, Turing Award-winning professor at MIT

See also 
 Goldwater (disambiguation)

German-language surnames
Jewish surnames
Yiddish-language surnames